Line 1: Praia Formosa ↔ Santos Dumont is one of the lines operated by VLT Carioca, being opened on 5 June 2016.

It has a total of 16 stops in operation, all at-grade. Besides that, another one is in planning. The stops Praia Formosa, Rodoviária, Providência, Parada dos Navios/Valongo, Carioca, Cinelândia and Santos Dumont has connection with other transport modals.

The system, operated by Concessionária do VLT Carioca S.A., registered a movement of more than 6 million passengers in the first 10 months of operation. Attends the following districts: Centro, Gamboa, Santo Cristo and Saúde.

History

Main events
 5 June 2016: Start of assisted operation, between Santos Dumont and Parada dos Museus, Mon-Fri 12p.m.-3p.m., with intervals of 20 minutes between trains and no fee.
 June 2016:
 Ampliation of the working hours: 10a.m.-5p.m.
 Ampliation of the working hours: 8a.m.-5p.m.
 9 July 2016: Start of the operation during weekends.
 12 July 2016: Start of the operation of branch between Parada dos Museus and Rodoviária.
 26 July 2016: Start of the commercial operation.
 3 August 2016: Olympic flame is transported through LRT, from Santos Dumont to Cinelândia.
 4 June 2017: Start of the operation of the second track of Line 1 between Gamboa and Parada dos Navios.

Interruptions
In the first business day of the LRT, on 6 June 2016, an electrical failure interrupted the operation of the service after one of the trains left Antônio Carlos, at 3p.m. (BRT). The activity of the composition was normalized after 20 minutes.

On 8 June 2016, a failure in the energy supply system interrupted the service between stops Sete de Setembro and São Bento. On 23 July, a security device was triggered by some object on the tracks and interrupted the operation in Avenida Rio Branco, next to Avenida Presidente Antônio Carlos and the service was dead for almost 3 hours.

On 31 August 2016, after the automatic shutdown of two Furnas transmission lines, the LRT operation was interrupted for an hour, between 3p.m. and 4p.m. (BRT).

On 25 January 2917, the traffic was interrupted for almost an hour after an accident with an elder woman, who fell next to the Avenida Central building, crossing Avenida Rio Branco. She didn't notice that there were two steps in the central flower bed, stumbled and fell with her face to the ground.

Stations
 Stations under construction or in project

Praia Formosa → Santos Dumont

Santos Dumont → Praia Formosa

References

Railway lines opened in 2016
Tram transport in Brazil